Shadows Over Trieste (Italian: Ombre su Trieste) is a 1952 Italian war drama film directed by Nerino Florio Bianchi and starring Giulio Donnini, Livio Lorenzon and Adriana Innocenti. It was part of a group of films made around the time that asserted Italy's unquestionable right to the disputed Free Territory of Trieste. It was funded by investors in Trieste and featured several local actors including Ketty Burba, a former Miss Trieste.

Cast
 Felga Lauri	as 	Lori
 Filiberto Conti	as Iuri
 Giulio Donnini as Taiola
 Livio Lorenzon as 	Carmine 
 Adriana Innocenti as 	Angela
 Tino Giordani as Bertino
 Grace Chiar as La baronessa
 Ketty Burba as 	Elena
 Raf Pindi as 	Don Mario

References

Bibliography
 Pizzi, Katia. A City in Search of an Author. A&C Black, 2002.

External links
 

1952 films
1950s Italian-language films
Films set in Trieste
Italian war films
1952 war films
Italian black-and-white films
1950s Italian films